The Kukatja people, also written Gugadja, are an Aboriginal Australian people of the Kimberley region of Western Australia.

Country
The northern frontier lay about Billiluna, and the waters at Ngaimangaima, a boundary marker between their northern neighbours the Dyaru, and the Ngardi to their east. They were present westerwards on the Canning Stock Route, from Koninara (Godfrey Tank) to Marawuru (Well 40). On their western borders were the Nangatara nation, with whom they had a hostile relationship.

Joint land claim
It was the 11th traditional land claim presented on behalf of Aboriginal traditional owners by the Central Land Council. The land borders on areas in which each of the languages – Ngarti, Warlpiri, and Kukatja – is dominant. People from the different language groups have been influenced by each other when residing at Balgo, Western Australia and Lajamanu, Northern Territory. The claim was presented at Balgo Mission. The recommendation handed down by Justice Sir William Kearney on 23 August 1985 and presented on 19 August 1986 was that "the whole of the claim area be granted to a Land Trust for the benefit of Aboriginals entitled by tradition to its use or occupation, whether or not the traditional entitlement is qualified as to place, time, circumstance, purpose or permission".

Language
The Kukatja people speak the Kukatja dialect of the Western Desert language.

Ethnographic studies
Sylvie Poirier has written a monograph dedicated to the analysis of dreams (kapukurri) in Gugadja culture. Many Kukatja now live in the Mulan community.

Alternative names

 Bedengo. ("rock hole people", suggesting shiftlessness)
 Bidong, Bidungo
 Bunara, Boonara
 Gogada
 Gogadja, Gugudja
 Gogoda, Gugadja
 Ilbaridja
 Julbaritja (fromjulbari (south))
 Julbre Kokatja Kukuruba(of Ngalia people)
 Manggai (southern toponym, a watering place)
 Nambulatji
 Panara (grass seed harvesters)
 Pardoo (of western Kukatja groups)
 Peedona, Peedong, Pidung, Pidunga
 Wanaeka
 Wangatjunga, Wangatunga, Wangkatunga, Wangkadjungga, Wankutjunga
 Wangkatjunga.(southern Kukatja groups)
 Wangu

Source:

See also
Ngururrpa, a grouping of peoples of language groups including Kukatja

Notes

Citations

Sources

Aboriginal peoples of Western Australia
Mid West (Western Australia)
Pilbara